Sergio Eduardo Diez Urzúa (2 April 1925 – 29 June 2015) was a Chilean architect and politician.

He is commonly remembered for having denied that arrested people disappeared during Pinochet dictatorship (1973–1990).

References

External links
 Chilean National Congress Library Profile

1925 births
2015 deaths
Chilean people
Conservative Party (Chile) politicians
Traditionalist Conservative Party politicians
United Conservative Party (Chile) politicians
National Party (Chile, 1966) politicians
National Renewal (Chile) politicians
Pontifical Catholic University of Chile alumni
Presidents of the Senate of Chile
Chilean anti-communists